Bruno Carrière (born 1953 in Cornwall, Ontario) is a Canadian film and television director and screenwriter. He is most noted for his film Lucien Brouillard, for which he garnered a Genie Award nomination for Best Director at the 5th Genie Awards in 1984.

His other credits have included the television series Traquenards, Super sans plomb, Diva and Rivière-des-Jérémie, and the documentary films 7 cordes pour une deuxième vie, L'art n'est point sans Soucy, Passions orchestrée, A session with Nettie and L'art est un jeu.

References

External links

1953 births
Living people
Canadian documentary film directors
Canadian television directors
Canadian screenwriters in French
Canadian television writers
Film directors from Ontario
People from Cornwall, Ontario
Franco-Ontarian people
Writers from Ontario